The 1946–47 season was Manchester City's 45th season of competitive football and 13th season in the second division of English football. In addition to the Second Division, the club competed in the FA Cup.

Second Division

League table

Results summary

References

External links

Manchester City F.C. seasons